Clarence Daniel Batchelor (April 1, 1888 – September 5, 1977), better known as C. D. Batchelor, was an American editorial cartoonist who was also noted for painting and sculpture. He won a Pulitzer Prize in 1937.

Biography
Batchelor was born in Osage City, Kansas. His journalistic career began in 1911 as a staff artist for the Kansas City Star. From 1914 to 1918 he worked as a free-lance artist, returning to newspapers in 1923 when he worked as a cartoonist in the New York Post for the Ledger Syndicate until 1931. He then found his permanent niche at the New York Daily News, where he worked until 1969. Batchelor's most famous editorial, published in 1936, reflected the newspaper's isolationist stance and won the Pulitzer Prize for Editorial Cartooning. It depicted a prototypical "Any European Youth" greeted by a skull-faced harlot representing War, captioned "Come on in, I'll treat you right, I used to know your Daddy." Sympathetic to women's suffrage, he contributed cartoons to Woman's Journal and The Woman Voter (which merged with the Journal in 1917). He also contributed his art to the causes of public health and public safety.

Batchelor is also known for having executed a bronze bust of Joseph Medill Patterson, the founder of the Daily News and co-founder of Liberty magazine, and a series of oil murals in The News Building.

Gallery

References

External links

Clarence Batchelor at Spartacus Educational
The Cartoon Collection of C. D. Batchelor Finding aid, Special Collections and Archives, University Libraries, Wichita State University 
C. D. Batchelor Papers: An inventory of his papers at Syracuse University Libraries, Special Collections Research Center
  (under 'Batchelor, Clarence Daniel, 1888-1977' and same without '1977')
 Geronimo - Apache Chief by Clarence Daniel Batchelor 
Cartoons and illustrations by C. D. Batchelor, Social Welfare History Image Portal, Virginia Commonwealth University Libraries

1888 births
1977 deaths
American editorial cartoonists
Pulitzer Prize for Editorial Cartooning winners
Place of death missing
People from Osage City, Kansas